Rahul Shah (born 3 January 1997) is an Indian cricketer. He made his List A debut for Gujarat in the 2017–18 Vijay Hazare Trophy on 11 February 2018. He made his first-class debut for Gujarat in the 2018–19 Ranji Trophy on 15 January 2019. He made his Twenty20 debut on 4 November 2021, for Gujarat in the 2021–22 Syed Mushtaq Ali Trophy.

References

External links
 

1997 births
Living people
Indian cricketers
Place of birth missing (living people)
Gujarat cricketers